The Municipality of Laško  is a municipality in eastern Slovenia. The seat of the municipality is the town of Laško. The area is part of the traditional region of Styria. The municipality is now included in the Savinja Statistical Region.

Settlements

In addition to the municipal seat of Laško, the municipality also includes the following settlements:

 Belovo
 Blatni Vrh
 Brezno
 Brodnice
 Brstnik
 Brstovnica
 Bukovca
 Curnovec
 Debro
 Doblatina
 Dol pri Laškem
 Gabrno
 Globoko
 Govce
 Gozdec
 Gračnica
 Harje
 Huda Jama
 Jagoče
 Jurklošter
 Kladje
 Klenovo
 Konc
 Kuretno
 Lahomno
 Lahomšek
 Lahov Graben
 Laška Vas
 Laziše
 Leskovca
 Lipni Dol
 Lokavec
 Lože
 Mačkovec
 Mala Breza
 Male Grahovše
 Marija Gradec
 Marijina Vas
 Modrič
 Mrzlo Polje
 Obrežje pri Zidanem Mostu
 Ojstro
 Olešče
 Padež
 Paneče
 Plazovje
 Polana
 Povčeno
 Požnica
 Radoblje
 Reka
 Rifengozd
 Rimske Toplice
 Sedraž
 Selo nad Laškim
 Senožete
 Šentrupert
 Sevce
 Širje
 Škofce
 Slivno
 Šmihel
 Šmohor
 Spodnja Rečica
 Stopce
 Strensko
 Strmca
 Suhadol
 Tevče
 Tovsto
 Trnov Hrib
 Trnovo
 Trobni Dol
 Trojno
 Udmat
 Velike Gorelce
 Velike Grahovše
 Veliko Širje
 Vodiško
 Vrh nad Laškim
 Zabrež
 Zgornja Rečica
 Zidani Most
 Žigon

References

External links

Municipality of Laško on Geopedia
Laško municipal website 

 
Lasko